Joseph Ignatius Nieminski (May 22, 1926 - September 20, 1992) was the first bishop of the Toronto-based Canadian Diocese of Polish National Catholic Church. He was born in Hazleton, Pennsylvania and ordained to the priesthood in 1946 after studies at Savonarola Theological Seminary in Scranton. He was consecrated in 1968, and served on the Polish National Catholic Church's dialogue commission with the Roman Catholic Church. While in Toronto with oversight for Canadian PNCC parishes, he also organized a Croatian National Catholic Church. Nieminski died in Toronto.

References 
Obituary, The Tribune (Scranton), September 23, 1992, page 7.

External links 
Grave

American bishops
American Polish National Catholics
Bishops of the Polish National Catholic Church
American people of Polish descent
1926 births
1992 deaths